The Scottish Handball Association Cup (known as the Scottish Cup) is a knock out cup competition run by the Scottish Handball Association.

Scottish National Cup Finals

Men's results

Winners in Bold

Scottish Cup Season 2009/10

Men's Competition

Quarter-final

Blackburn Community Centre, West Lothian
24 April 2010

Semi-final

Blackburn Community Centre, West Lothian
8 May 2010

Final

Paisley Lagoon Leisure Centre, Paisley
22 May 2010

Women's Competition

Final

Paisley Lagoon Leisure Centre, Paisley
22 May 2010

Mini's Competition

Paisley Lagoon Leisure Centre, Paisley
22 May 2010

Round Robin Group Matches

Final

Junior Boys Competition

Final
Paisley Lagoon Leisure Centre, Paisley
22 May 2010

Junior Girls Competition

Paisley Lagoon Leisure Centre, Paisley
22 May 2010

Final

References

External links
 Official site

Handball competitions in Scotland